Simona Halep defeated Beatriz Haddad Maia in the final, 6–3, 2–6, 6–3 to win the women's singles tennis title at the 2022 Canadian Open. It was her third Canadian Open title. Haddad Maia became the first Brazilian to contest a WTA 1000 final.

Camila Giorgi was the defending champion, but lost in the third round to Jessica Pegula in a rematch of last year's semifinal.

This marked the last Canadian Open appearance for three-time champion and former world No. 1 Serena Williams, who lost in the second round to Belinda Bencic.

Seeds 
The top eight seeds received a bye into the second round.

Draw

Finals

Top half

Section 1

Section 2

Bottom half

Section 3

Section 4

Seeded players
The following are the seeded players. Seedings are based on WTA rankings as of August 1, 2022. Rank and points before are as of August 8, 2022.

The event is not mandatory on the women's side and points from the 2021 tournament are included in the table below only if they counted towards the player's ranking as of August 8, 2022. For other players, the points defending column shows the lower of (a) points from her second-highest non-mandatory WTA 1000 tournament (which are required to be counted in her ranking) or (b) her 16th best result.

Points defending will be replaced at the end of the tournament by (a) the player's points from the 2022 tournament, (b) her 17th best result, or (c) points from her second-highest non-mandatory WTA 1000 event.

† Points from the player's 16th best result (for points defending) or 17th best result (for points won), in each case as of August 8, 2022.
‡ Points from the player's second-best non-mandatory WTA 1000 event, which are required to be counted in her ranking.
§ The player is defending points from an ITF tournament (2021 Landisville or 2019 Vancouver).

Withdrawn players 
The following players would have been seeded, but withdrew before the tournament began.

Other entry information

Wild cards

Protected ranking

Withdrawals

Retirements

Qualifying

Seeds

Qualifiers

Lucky losers

Qualifying draw

First qualifier

Second qualifier

Third qualifier

Fourth qualifier

Fifth qualifier

Sixth qualifier

Seventh qualifier

Eighth qualifier

References

External links 
 Main draw
 Qualifying draw

2022 WTA Tour